Wendt is a German surname. Notable people with the surname include:

 Albert Wendt (born 1939), Samoan poet in New Zealand
 Alexander Wendt (born 1958), American political scientist
 Amadeus Wendt (1783–1836), German philosopher and music theorist 
 Benny Wendt (born 1950), Swedish footballer
 Bill Wendt (1915–1966), American basketball coach and professional player
 Botho Wendt August Graf zu Eulenburg (1831–1911), Prussian politician
 Carl von Wendt (born 1953), Swedish curler
 Dean Wendt (born 1968), American voice actor
 E. Allan Wendt (born 1935), first US Ambassador to Slovenia
 François Willi Wendt (1909–1970), French painter
 Friedrich von Wendt (1738–1808), German physician
 Georg Wendt (1889–1948), German politician 
 George Wendt (born 1948), American actor
 Guenter Wendt (1923–2010), German-American engineer 
 Hans Hinrich Wendt, theologian
 Henry Lorensz Wendt (1858-1911), Sri Lankan Burgher lawyer, judge, and legislator
 J. M. Wendt (1830–1917), South Australian jeweller
 Jana Wendt (born 1956), Australian TV journalist
 Joja Wendt (born 1964), jazz musician
 Lionel Wendt (1900–1944), Sri Lankan pianist, photographer and critic
 Marian Wendt (born 1985), German politician
 Martin Wendt (active in 2000s), Danish professional poker player 
 Mats Wendt (born 1965), Classical composer
 Oscar Wendt (born 1985), Swedish footballer
 Roger Wendt (born 1933), Iowan politician and legislator
 Viola S. Wendt (1907–1986), American poet
Wilhelmina Wendt (1896–1988), Swedish silversmith
 William Wendt (1865–1946), German-American landscape painter

See also
 Wend (disambiguation)
 Wendt & Kühn, a German manufacturer of wooden figures and music boxes

Ethnonymic surnames
German-language surnames